Aprada-tepui is a tepui in Bolívar state, Venezuela. It gives its name to the Aprada Massif, which also includes the smaller Araopán-tepui to the east. A steep, semi-circular ridge connects these two summits.

Both peaks are situated entirely within the bounds of Canaima National Park.

Flora and fauna
Frogs Pristimantis jamescameroni and Anomaloglossus breweri are endemic to Aprada-tepui—they are found nowhere else.

See also
 Distribution of Heliamphora

References

Further reading

 Barrio-Amorós, C.L. (17 January 2006). A new dendrobatid frog (Anura: Dendrobatidae: Colostethus) from Aprada tepui, southern Venezuela. Zootaxa 1110: 59–68.
  Brewer-Carías, C. (2010). El origen de los tepuyes: los hijos de las estrellas. Río Verde 3: 54–69.

Tepuis of Venezuela
Mountains of Venezuela
Mountains of Bolívar (state)